The 2016 Faroe Islands Cup was the 62nd edition of Faroe Islands domestic football cup. The competition started on 24 March and will end on 27 August. Víkingur are the defending champions, having won their fifth cup title the previous year. The winner of competition will qualify for the first qualifying round  of the 2017–18 UEFA Europa League.

Only the first teams of Faroese football clubs were allowed to participate. The preliminary round involves clubs from 1. deild, 2. deild and one team from 3. deild. The remaining teams from 1. deild and all of the Effodeildin enter the competition in the first round.

Participating clubs

TH – Title Holders

Round and draw dates

Preliminary round
Two clubs from 2. deild and one each from 1. deild and 3. deild entered this round. The matches took place on 24 and 26 March.

|}

First round
All ten clubs from the Effodeildin, four from 1. deild and the two winners of Preliminary round entered this round.

|}

Quarter-finals

|}

Semi-finals

|}

Final

Top goalscorers

References

External links
Cup in Faroe Soccer

Faroe Islands Cup seasons
Cup
Faroe Islands Cup